Rongcheng District is a district under jurisdiction of Jieyang City, located in the southern Chinese province of Guangdong. Located at 116°17′E to 116°23′E longitude and 23°27′N to 23°33′N latitude. Rongcheng is 13.5 kilometers in length and 14 kilometers in height and has a total area of 91.26 square kilometers.

References

County-level divisions of Guangdong
Jieyang